The 1983 Skate Canada International was held in Halifax, Nova Scotia on October 27–29. Medals were awarded in the disciplines of men's singles, ladies' singles, and ice dancing.

Results

Men

Ladies

Ice dancing

References

Skate Canada International, 1983
Skate Canada International
1983 in Canadian sports 
1983 in Nova Scotia